Radha Govind Law College is a private law school situated at Radha Govind Nagar, Lalki Ghati, Ramgarh in the Indian state of Jharkhand. The college offers three-years B.A., LL.B. and five years integrated L.L.B course approved by the Bar Council of India (BCI), New Delhi and affiliated to Vinoba Bhave University of Hazaribag. Radha Govind Law College was established in 2016.

References

Law schools in Jharkhand
Universities and colleges in Jharkhand
Educational institutions established in 2016
2016 establishments in Jharkhand
Colleges affiliated to Vinoba Bhave University